This is a list of American sandwiches. This list contains entries of sandwiches that were created in, or commonly eaten in the United States. A sandwich is a food item consisting of one or more types of food placed on or between slices of bread, or more generally any dish wherein two or more pieces of bread serve as a container or wrapper for some other food. The sandwich was originally a portable food item or finger food which began its popularity primarily in the Western World, but is now found in various versions in numerous countries worldwide.

American sandwiches

See also

 American Sandwich: Great Eats from All 50 States
 List of bread dishes
 List of sandwiches
 List of submarine sandwich restaurants
 List of American foods
 List of foods
 List of hamburgers
 Sandwich bread
 Sandwiches That You Will Like

References

External links
 

Sandwiches